The Sandwalk Adventures is a graphic novel created by Assistant Professor of Biology at Juniata College, Jay Hosler.  It was originally published in 2001 as five comic books, and republished as into a single graphic novel in 2003.  The Sandwalk Adventures is the tale of follicle mites living in the left eyebrow of Charles Darwin himself.  The mites believe Darwin to be a god, one of their creation myths handed down from generation to generation, and he has to set them straight about that and other mite fables.  A humorous series of illustrated lessons in natural selection and evolution ensues.

Reception
The Sandwalk Adventures was nominated for an Eisner Award in 2002.

External links
 Active Synapse website
 Jay Hosler's website

American graphic novels
Books about Charles Darwin